Ronald Vincent 'Vince' Smith is a male retired boxer who competed for England.

Boxing career
Smith represented England and won a silver medal in the light-heavyweight (-81 Kg) division, at the 1978 Commonwealth Games in Edmonton, Alberta, Canada.

He was the National Champion in 1978 after winning the prestigious 1978 ABA light-heavyweight Championship, boxing for the Kyrle Hall ABC.

References

English male boxers
Boxers at the 1978 Commonwealth Games
Commonwealth Games medallists in boxing
Commonwealth Games silver medallists for England
Light-heavyweight boxers
Medallists at the 1978 Commonwealth Games